Castelguidone is a comune and town in the province of Chieti in the Abruzzo region of Italy.

References

External links

Official website 

Cities and towns in Abruzzo